Julian Bethwaite (born 14 July 1957) is an Australian, Sydney-based skiff sailor and sailboat designer. He wrote one chapter of his father Frank's book, Higher Performance Sailing.

Skiff sailing 
Bethwaite started sailing 18ft skiffs in 1974 crewing on KB, before moving on to the boats 9Sports, Singapore Airline, and Mutual Acceptance. Bethwaite won his first 18 ft Skiff World Championship as crew in 1987 and again as skipper in 1990 and 1992. He held several positions relating to the 18 ft class, including secretary of NSW 18 ft Skiff Sailing League, manager of the Super Skiff Series, and Skiff Grand Prix. At this time, Grand Prix Sailing was covered on TV. Internationally, his partnership with Alex Gad developed media driven sailing events throughout Europe, the U.S., and Mexico that resulted in three Sport-Tel awards.

Sailboat designs
In 1980 based on a stretched Tasar Dinghy hull, he designed the first of the trilogy of Prime Computer 18 ft skiffs. It had a crew of two rather than the usual three which made sailing the boat difficult when handling the spinnaker pole and its complex wire bracing. It was this complexity that made Bethwaite design the Prime Mk2 with a fixed bowsprit and asymmetric spinnaker. To keep the weight down, the hull was made of balsa wood and weighed just 130 pounds (60kgs).

Prime Mk3 was also made of balsa wood, had a wingspan of 26 ft, and weighed just 99 pounds (45kgs). This was later used to make a plug for the standardized B18 class.

In 1994, Bethwaite designed the 49er which was a new high performance skiff. In 1996, it was one of 15 entries considered by the ISAF selection competition for the upcoming 2000 Sydney Olympics.
 The Olympic committee selected the 49er. From the 2000 Olympics and onwards, the 49er sailed with country flag designs covering the entire spinnaker, making it clear which boat was which.

In 1998, the smaller 29er was designed for the international youth market. The 29er has been given International Class status In 2004, he worked with Martin Billoch and Chris Mitchell to design the SKUD 18, a ballasted skiff for disabled sailors. From 2008 through 2016 this boat has been raced at the Paralympic Games.

In 2012, ISAF held trials for a women's high performance boat to race at the Olympics. Bethwaite submitted the 29erXX, a souped up 29er with bigger sails. Although this boat lost out, the winning entry, the 49erFX from Mackay Boats (which developed a new mast and suit of sails) does feature Bethwaite's 49er hull.

List of designs 
 1978 assisted Ian Bruce and his father, Frank, with the design of the Laser 2.
 1980 started skiff designs that included three two-handed Prime Computers designs that pioneered the asymmetric spinnaker system.
 1987 designed the B14 skiff.
 1988 designed the B18 skiff, a consumerised Prime Mk3.
 1994, designed the 49er skiff.
 1998 designed the 29er youth skiff trainer.
 2005 collaborated with Martin Billoch and Chris Mitchell to design the SKUD 18.

Awards 
 1999 awarded the Royal Institute of Naval Architects Award for Outstanding Achievement in Small Boat Design (for the 29er and 49er).
 2000 awarded the Australian Sports Medal.
 SeaHorse award for innovation and safety for KeyBall trapeze system developed with Allen Brothers.

National championships 
 1st Cherub Australian Championships 1975
 1st Tasar Australian Championships 1977-8
 1st Euro 18 ft skiff Championships 1992
 1st B14 Australian Championships 1992
 2002 – 2015 designed Trilogy, a 32 ft (11m) trimaran that won 9 OMR (Australian Multihull Regattas).

World championships 
 1st Cherub World Championships 1970. (Crew)
 1st 18 ft Skiff World Championships (crew) 1986 Entrad
 1st Grand Prix Champion (crew) 1987 Goodman Fielder
 1st 18 ft Skiff World Championships 1990  AAMI
 1st Grand Prix Champion 1990  AAMI
 1st 18 ft Skiff World Championships 1992   AAMI
 1st Grand Prix Champion 1993  AAMI

References

Julian Bethwaite
1957 births
Living people
Australian male sailors (sport)
Australian yacht designers